Katie is a feminine and masculine surname. 

Katie may also refer to:

 Katie, Oklahoma, United States, a town
 , a United States Navy patrol vessel in commission from 1917 to 1918
 Katie (talk show), a syndicated American talk show (2012–2014) hosted by Katie Couric
 Katie (British TV series), a reality TV show about Katie Price
 Katie: Portrait of a Centerfold, a 1978 American TV movie starring Kim Basinger
 The W19 nuclear artillery shell

See also

Karie (disambiguation)
 Katie.com: My Story, a memoir by Katie Tarbox